Bill Stone (1 August 1936 – 11 May 2020), was a nephrologist at Vanderbilt University Medical Center. He was head of the kidney department at the Nashville Veterans Affairs Medical Center, part of the Tennessee Valley Healthcare System, for over 45 years. There, in the 1970s, he began the first dialysis treatments that could be performed both in a healthcare setting and at home. During this time he helped work out how to administer safe doses of penicillin to people with kidney failure, who otherwise might develop toxic levels of penicillin in their blood.

Early life and education
William J. Stone was born on 1 August 1936 in Washington D. C., to William Spencer Stone, an army physician and later dean of University of Maryland Medical School, and his wife Louise Rankin Stone. After graduating from Princeton University in 1957, he gained his medical degree from the Johns Hopkins School of Medicine, and then worked at Vanderbilt University where he completed his medical residency before serving there as chief resident. Subsequently he gained a nephrology fellowship at Cornell University.

Career
He served as Major in the U.S. Army and Medical Officer at the 3rd Field Hospital in Saigon from 1968-1969, during the Vietnam War. After the war he was appointed assistant professor of medicine at Vanderbilt. In 1972, he became chief of Nephrology.

Stone was head of the kidney department at the Nashville Veterans Affairs Medical Center, part of the Tennessee Valley Healthcare System, for over 45 years. There, in the 1970s, he began the first dialysis treatments that could be performed both in a healthcare setting and at home. During this time, with infectious disease specialist Charles S. Bryan, he worked out how to administer safe doses of penicillin to people with kidney failure, who otherwise might develop toxic levels of penicillin in their blood.

Personal and family
Stone composed limericks and produced five volumes on medical limericks. He was married to Elizabeth and they had three children.

Death and legacy
He died on 11 May 2020 in Nashville. A renal dialysis unit is named for him.

Selected publications
 (Co-authored)

References 

1936 births
2020 deaths
American nephrologists
Vanderbilt University faculty
People from Washington, D.C.